Vincent Joseph Codrington (born 18 July 1956) is an English sports administrator and a former CEO of Middlesex County Cricket Club. 

Codrington was educated at St. Benedict's School, Ealing. He played rugby union as a fly half for Richmond and also served as its Director of Rugby, during its transition from amateur to professional rugby. He opened the batting for Barnes Cricket Club.

Codrington succeeded Joe Hardstaff as Secretary of Middlesex County Cricket Club in 1997 and later assumed the role of Chief Executive. He announced his resignation on 3 July 2015 after 18 years' service at Lord's. He is a Trustee of the READY Charity

References

1956 births
Living people
English cricket administrators
Chief executives of Middlesex County Cricket Club
Secretaries of Middlesex County Cricket Club
People educated at St Benedict's School, Ealing
English rugby union players
Rugby union fly-halves
Rugby union players from London